The Copa Mercosur 1999 was the 2nd staging of the Copa Mercosur, a club competition played between teams from the Southern part of South America. 

The competition started on 27 July 1999 and concluded on 20 December 1999 with Flamengo beating Palmeiras in the final.

Participants

 Boca Juniors
 San Lorenzo
 Independiente
 Vélez Sársfield
 River Plate
 Racing
 Vasco da Gama
 Flamengo
 Corinthians
 Cruzeiro
 São Paulo
 Palmeiras
 Grêmio
 Universidad Católica
 Colo Colo 
 Universidad de Chile
 Cerro Porteño
 Olimpia
 Nacional
 Peñarol

Details
 The 20 teams were divided into 5 groups of 4 teams. Each team plays the other teams in the group twice. The top team from each group qualified for the quarter-finals along with the best 3 runners up.
 From the quarter finals to the final, two legs were played in each round. In the result of a draw, the match was decided by a penalty shoot out.

Group stage

Group A

Group B

Group C

Group D

Group E

Quarter-finals

First leg

Second leg

Palmeiras won 7–5 on aggregate.

Flamengo won 5–1 on aggregate.

San Lorenzo won 4–2 on aggregate.

Peñarol won 3–1 on aggregate.

Semi-finals

First leg

Second leg

Palmeiras won 3–1 on aggregate.

Flamengo won 6–3 on aggregate.

Final

First leg

Second leg

References
RSSSF - Copa Mercosur 1999

Copa Mercosur
3
Merc